Chirac is a former commune in the Lozère département in southern France. On 1 January 2016, it was merged into the new commune of Bourgs-sur-Colagne. Its population was 1,144 in 2019.

Geography
Situated on the banks of the Colagne river in the heart of the Massif central.
The D809 road passes through the village.

Population

Places and monuments
 The Fare dolmen
 The twelfth century Romanesque church.
 The chapel of Saint-Jean-Baptiste.
 The family chapels of the Chazette and the Volmanières
 The English cross: The English, who ravaged the country in the 14th century, were soundly beaten in a battle on the heights of the village. This place carries today the name of Cemetery of the English or Cross of the English. A cross, on which there is an inscription "CH des M"  and "1701 - 1922", marks the site of the battle. During the construction of the A75 autoroute, the cross was renovated and moved a few metres from its original position.
 The bridge over the Colagne river.

Activities
As in the majority of the towns of Lozère, the principal activity is farming, although service industry sectors have started to play a larger part in the region.
 Farming is essentially sheep and cattle. The size of the upland meadows allows the farmers to have comparatively large flocks.

Notable people
 Colonel Marceau Crespin (1915–1988)
 Nicolaï Greschny (1912–1985), artist

See also
 Communes of the Lozère department

References

External links

 Official town website

Former communes of Lozère